XHCAV-FM is a Spanish & English Top 40 (CHR) radio station in Durango, Durango, Mexico. It carries the Exa FM format from MVS Radio.

History
In 1954, the concession was authorized for a new radio station on 1470 kHz, XEND-AM. Sometime in the early 1970s, the station's calls changed to XECAV-AM in recognition of the founder of the radio group, Carlos Armas Vegas.

The station migrated to FM in the early 2010s.

References

Regional Mexican radio stations
Radio stations in Durango
Mass media in Durango City